Corticopontine fibers are projections from the cerebral cortex to the pontine nuclei.

Depending upon the lobe of origin, they can be classified as frontopontine fibers, parietopontine fibers, temporopontine fibers or occipitopontine fibers.

References

External links
Cortex->Pons->Cerebellum: 
 https://www.csuchico.edu/~pmccaffrey/syllabi/CMSD%20320/362unit7.html
 

Cerebral white matter